Midhurst Cricket Ground (exact name and location unknown) was a cricket ground in Midhurst, Sussex.  The first recorded match on the ground was in 1830, when a Sussex team played the only first-class match at the ground against a side representing Surrey.  The final recorded match on the ground came in 1866 when Midhurst played a United All-England Eleven.

References

External links
Midhurst Cricket Ground on CricketArchive
Midhurst Cricket Ground on Cricinfo

Defunct cricket grounds in England
Cricket grounds in West Sussex
Defunct sports venues in West Sussex
Sports venues completed in 1830
1830 establishments in England
Midhurst